Ginx TV, officially GINX Esports TV (stylised as GiПX ESPORTSTV), is a United Kingdombased media group specialised in Esports for an international audience. Alongside its TV channel, Ginx TV also publishes a website focused on gaming and esports news and guides.

History
Ginx TV was founded in 2007 by Alistair Gosling (who founded the Extreme Sports Channel), Udi Shapira, and Cosmo Spens.

Ginx TV was launched in August 2008 on Romania's Boom TV satellite television platform. , Ginx TV operates in Southeast Asia, East Africa and Europe. In two regions, Indonesia and Turkey, Ginx TV is represented by the Dori Media Group. A high-definition simulcast of the channel, called Ginx HD, was temporarily available on Hispasat 1E during 2011. On 30 July 2012, the channel became available in HD again on StarHub TV in Singapore.

In August 2010, Ginx TV announced plans to launch in the UK and Ireland, where the channel expected a potential audience of over 12 million viewers through Sky and Virgin Media. In October 2010, Red Bee Media was appointed to create a new identity and on-screen presentation for the channel.

In March 2011, it was announced that the British launch had been delayed until its release on Virgin Media on 9 July 2013. A video on demand service was also available in the UK on BT Vision from 26 May 2011. The company's programmes are also globally distributed to third party broadcasters such as TVNZ U in New Zealand, Zee Trendz in India, OSN in the Middle East and North Africa and EGO in Israel.

On 12 December 2011, Ginx TV agreed to license some of its content to American video gaming website The Escapist.

In April 2015, Ginx formed a temporary partnership with DStv which would welcome esports into South Africa, becoming the first dedicated esports channel in South Africa. The brand returned in 2017 through a partnership with SuperSport and DStv which would give it a dedicated channel.

In June 2016, it was announced that, with the partnership of Sky and ITV, Ginx TV was to be relaunched as GINX Esports TV, shifting its focus to covering esports. With this change, the channel launched on 24 June 2016 on Sky, in addition to it already being available to watch on Virgin Media.

On 15 February 2017, it was announced that Canadian premium service Super Channel would launch a domestic version of Ginx as a replacement for one of its multiplex channels. Replacing Super Channel 4, GINX Esports TV Canada launched on 4 May 2017 with a live edition of The Bridge.

The same month, GINX Esports TV also entered Israel, via a partnership with Partner's 4GTV app.

In October 2017, Ginx announced a partnership with Telekom Austria Group to make the channel available across Europe on Eutelsat 16A.

In October 2018, Ginx announced it had terminated its contract with Virgin Media.

In October 2019, Ginx launched the ginx.tv website dedicated to gaming and esports news in English. It expanded to Spanish in 2020.

Services

TV channel
Utilising its own TV studios and production arm, GINX TV creates and publishes the GINX Esports TV channel, backed by Sky Group and ITV plc.

Since June 2016, the channel has partnered with game publishers and tournament organisers to broadcast some of the most prominent esports competition. GINX Esports TV also broadcasts its own creations such as Origins, a docu-series looking back at how the most popular video-games came to be, Top 10 or That Gaming Show.

In January 2022, GINX Esports TV also started broadcasting some its shows live on Twitch.

Production company 
Through its production arm, GINX Studios, the company also creates and delivers esports programmes and competitions for publishers, media organizations, brands and esports organizations including OG esports or EXCEL esports.

Online Media 
GINX TV owns and operates ginx.tv a digital outlet dedicated to esports, gaming and entertainment. The website is monetized through programmatic static and video advertising. In 2021, the website expanded to cover mobile gaming, slowly becoming one of its core competencies.

Programming

Current programming
 The First Hour  Shows the latest big release or revisited a modern classic by playing through the first 60 minutes. Reintroduced in 2017. Presented by Adam Savage (2013–present), Neil Cole (2014), Simon Longden (20132014), Lucy James (20132014) and Anthony Richardson (2014–present).
Origins  A look back at the origins of some of your favourite Esports titles.
Shut Up & Play (ex. GINX Plays)  The cast and crew of Ginx Esports TV plays some of their favourite titles in this stream-on-TV format.
 Top 10  Countdown of the Top 10 characters, games of a certain genre, etc. Presented by Adam Savage (2017–present).
 Ant & Sav vs The World  RL to FIFA or Street Fighter V, Ant and Save invite their viewers to join them in an exclusive competition.
Connector  The CS:GO Podcast  James Banks's interview podcast sees top CS:GO personalities give insights into the esports scene.
That "Gaming" Show  covering all the latest stories from gaming, Esports and entertainment. Hosted by Stumpie and Cole.
Crossfeed  a series for the best influencer and streamer world from this week and last.
LetsPlay Live  sees players from different teams compete to gain points to qualify into the OCE championship later in the year.
Social Gaming and Coconuts  giving you behind the scenes access to the world of social and causal gaming.
Action Figures Adventure Series  follow collector Jay Bartlett across North America as he hopes to build the ultimate action figure auction in the name of charity.
Game Set To Music  stunning graphics and massive tunes combined.

Former programming
Daily Download  From the latest mercato news to the most recent merchandise launch, a light-hearted look at what's happening in the world of Esports and gaming with Emile Cole and Alex Knight.
101  Learn the ins and outs of a number of popular Esports titles in order to go from being a newbie to a pro.
This Week in Esports  A look back at the last seven days in Esports, hosted by former pro and Esports commentator F-Word.
Fight Card  showcasing games involving community members.
SQUAD  covers everything gaming and internet culture.
HUD  Heads Up Daily TV. The premiere and only Esports TV show in Canada.
The Bridge  Late night, cross game, eSports live entertainment talk show. Hosted by Frank Soldato.
 Games Games Games  Previews and reviews of games that are both child and family friendly.
The Ginx Vault  A look at retro games.
 The Blurb  The channel's flagship show which compiled the latest in gaming news, reviews and previews.  Presented by Julia Hardy (20112012), Anthony Richardson (2012), Lizzie Huang (2013), and Lucy James (2013–2014). The show was replaced by The Essentials in September 2014.
 Culture Shock  Series dedicated to the culture surrounding video gaming including film, music and comic books.
 Faster  Games that focused on racing with a particular focus on motorsport. Presented by Neil Cole (20112014).
Games Room  Esports and streaming personalities face various games challenges that test their skill and reactions across a number of competitive titles, before being allowed to leave.
 GameFace  Started broadcasting in 2009 on Bravo, before being replaced by The Blurb in 2011 on Challenge.
 Ginx Files  GameFace's sister show.
 Ginx Live  A live show fronted by Adam Savage with special guests, gameplay coverage and giveaways every week on Virgin Media, Twitch and later on YouTube. The news was presented by Chris Bond and Lydia Ellery while Chris Slight and Haplo Shaffer talked to the public and communicated their views.
 Get Fragged  Followed the genre of first-person shooters.
 The Ginx Masterchart  A weekly top ten of chart games, counting down the biggest sellers of that week.
 The Ginx Top 40/10 Chart  A countdown of the biggest games of the week. 
 Ginx News  A daily update of news within the gaming world. Presented by Lucy James (20132014).
 Most Wanted  Interviews and previews.
 Rumble Pack  A series of top ten countdowns that compared characters, genres and specific games.
 Gamesport  Provided reviews and commentary on games within the sports genre. Presented by Anthony Richardson (20102014).
 Planet of the Apps  Previews, reviews and recommendations of mobile apps, games and gadgets. Presented by Adam Savage (20112015), Lucy Hedges (20142015) and David McClelland (20142015).
 Videogame Nation  Only airing on Challenge in the UK, but on Ginx TV in other countries, each episode focused on one game, series or developer, with discussion of related titles and gaming history. In August 2014, the show was revamped with new hosts and a new format following criticism of the original version. Variously hosted by Tom Deacon (2014), Emily Hartridge (2014), Nathan Caton (2014), Aoife Wilson (20142016), Dan Maher (20142016) and John Robertson (20142016) with additional insight from 'talking heads' such as Steve McNeil and Chris Slight in the show's current format.
  Minecraft: Digging Deeper  Teaches the basics of Minecraft and also more "advanced" and lesser-known Minecraft features with gameplay and narration. Explains from how to survive the first night all the way to how to dye wool, how to build a good home, how to use redstone well, etc.
 Console Yourself  A show in which stand-up comedians confessed their videogame loves, hates, and guilty secrets. Presented by Neil Cole (2014–present).
 Games Evolved  Tracked the history of a particular game or genre and comments on how different themes or ideas have been treated by different companies, series or decades.
 Ginx Playlist  A look at recommended games.
 The Quest  Focused on the genre of role-playing video games.
 Under The Radar  A show introduced in June 2015 which focused on brand new and classic indie games, DLC and other games which may have gone under the radar.
IRL  Docu-reality series centered on the daily life of some the most notorious UK eSports personalities, presented by Charleyy.
 GGM (Good Games Monthly)  A monthly magazine show counting covering the world of Esports and casual gaming.
The Dojo  A deep dive into the world of the FGC (Fighting Game Community) led by Fighting Game players/casters Damascus and Tyrant.

References

External links
 

2007 establishments in the United Kingdom
Digital television in the United Kingdom
ITV television channels
Mass media companies based in London
Sky television channels
Television channels and stations established in 2008
Television channels in the United Kingdom
Television shows about video games
Video game culture